Ubiquitin-like protein 4A is a protein that in humans is encoded by the UBL4A gene.

References

Further reading